Mark Mangini (born 1956) is an American sound editor with over 125 film credits. He won the 2015 Academy Award for Best Sound Editing along with David White for their work on Mad Max: Fury Road.

Mangini is renowned for recording and editing a new roar track for Leo the Lion, the MGM lion mascot (ironically, tiger sounds were used for the effect).

In April 2017, Mangini partnered with Pro Sound Effects to release The Odyssey Collection, developed from his personal sound library built throughout his career with partner Richard L. Anderson.

Mangini is of Italian descent. He married actress Annette McCarthy in 1984 and they had two sons. They separated some time later. He also has a son, Rio, from his current marriage.

Oscar nominations 
Mangini has received the following nominations for Best Sound Editing and Academy Award for Best Sound for Dune in 2021.
1986 Academy Awards: Nominated for Star Trek IV: The Voyage Home. Lost to Aliens.
1992 Academy Awards: Nominated for Aladdin. Lost to Bram Stoker's Dracula.
1997 Academy Awards: Nominated for The Fifth Element. Lost to Titanic.
88th Academy Awards: Won for Mad Max: Fury Road.
90th Academy Awards: Nominated for: Blade Runner 2049. Lost to Dunkirk.
94th Academy Awards: Won for Dune.

References

External links 

1956 births
Living people
American sound editors
People from Boston
Best Sound Editing Academy Award winners
American people of Italian descent
Best Sound Mixing Academy Award winners